Mohammad Khan Junejo (18 August 193218 March 1993) was a Pakistani politician and an agriculturist who served as the tenth prime minister of Pakistan, having elected in this capacity in 1985 until being dismissed in 1988.

Junejo, a powerful landowner and was introduced in the agricultural industry , was educated in Karachi, having attended the St. Patrick's College, and was trained as an agriculturist at the Agricultural Institute  near Hastings in the United Kingdom. He gained public notice when he joined the Ayub administration and subsequently held cabinet portfolio of railways, health, communications and labour from 1963–69.

After participating in the elections held in 1985, he was chosen to form the government on a Pakistan Muslim League's platform, of which, he took over the party's presidency. His government was noted for the support of conservatism, austerity measures that ultimately reduces the government budget deficits and repealed the emergency laws to allow the freedom of press and media in the country. Despite strong resistance and fierce opposition from President Zia-ul-Haq, Junejo authorized his Foreign Minister Yakob Khan to sign and ratified the Geneva Accords in 1988. His relations with President Zia-ul-Haq also soured when he opened the parliamentary inquiry on Ojhri Camp disaster, also in 1988.

On 29 May 1988, Prime Minister Junejo was dismissed by President Zia who leveled charges on incompetency and economic stagflation and immediately called for new general elections. After the general elections held in 1988, he led his own faction while being ceremonial party's presidency.

Early life and education 
Mohammad Khan Junejo belonged to a Sindhi Rajput Family. He was born in Sindhri Tharparker in Mirpur Khas District, Sind, British India on 18 August 1932. He hailed from an influential agriculturalist (Haji Alisher Shah) feudalist family in Sind that had a traditional conservative mindset.

He was educated at the St. Patrick's High School in Karachi and later graduated from the St. Patrick's College. He went to Hastings in England where he was trained as an agriculturist and earned a diploma to be certified in 1954.

Junejo was an agriculturist and a farmer who cultivated the famed mangoes (the Sindhri) in his local village in the Mirpur Khas. Junejo was a conservative Muslim and a dominant figure in his village, who had his wife living in the village for her entire life, and kept her out of public sight even when he was elected as Prime Minister and eventually moved to Prime Minister's Secretariat. Nothing or very little was known about his wife as he often traveled and visited other states with his elder daughter; he was married with five children.

His public image was popular in politics for his driving of blue coloured Suzuki Mehran and, he popularly drove the Mehran in Islamabad despite the annoyance of President Zia who had a strong preference for Mercedes-Benz W126.

Political career

Upon returning from the United Kingdom in 1954, he joined the Pakistan Muslim League (PML) and was elected as Mayor for Sanghar District and worked as a party worker for the Muslim League until 1963. He participated in elections and was elected for West-Pakistan legislative assembly and soon he joined the Ayub administration and subsequently held cabinet department of Health, Communications and Labour until 1965.

He again successfully participated in the presidential elections in 1965, and was elevated as the Minister of Railways under the Ayub administration which he served until 1969. From 1970–77, he was unable to defend his constituency from Sanghar but became closer to religious leader Pir Pagara, of which he later became his political missionary.

In 1977, he was named as a caretaker cabinet minister when General Zia-ul-Haq, the chief of army staff, took over the civilian government led by Prime Minister Zulfikar Ali Bhutto. From 1977–79, he served as the Railway minister but later resigned in 1979.

Prime Minister of Pakistan

In January 1985, President Zia-ul-Haq announced to hold nationwide general elections that would be based on non-partisanism– there have been political rumors that the U.S. President Ronald Reagan had a subsequent political role in such regards.

Junejo was successful in defending his constituency from the Sanghar District and was known to be a religiopolitical missionary of Pir Pagara who had been leading his own political faction in Sindh. President Zia considered three names for the appointment of the Prime Minister that included: Ghulam Mustafa Jatoi, Liaquat Ali Jatoi and Junejo– all were from Sindh. After consulting with Pir Pagara, President Zia hand-picked and appointed Junejo as Prime Minister through an invitation to form the civilian government in accordance to the revival of constitution.

His mindset reflected a conservatism and was a powerful feudalist whom President Zia considered him to be ineffective in leading towards the decision-making processes. and after securing votes in the Parliament through the Vote of Confidence (VoC), he met with President Zia and reportedly asking him about the ending of the martial law.

The martial law was eventually lifted on his repeated instances and announced his cabinet which saw the ouster of many of President Zia's military members in the civilian cabinet. He kept two ministerial departments of defence and interior.

Prime Minister Junejo's social policies led to the political independence when he was appointed as the President of Pakistan Muslim League. His policy also included the freedom of the press despite the opposition he faced with President Zia in this issue. He gained popularity and significance for his daring stance and disagreement with President Zia over many issues that President Zia had been managing since his control over the government since 1977.

On the economic front, he took the austerity measures and ultimately halted the Islamization of Economy ran under President Zia, which eventually put him at odds with President Zia.

Junejo Event

In 1986–87, his political relations with President Zia began to deteriorate over the control over the foreign policy and daringly authorized his Foreign Minister Yakob Ali Khan to ratify the Geneva Accords that allowed the Russian retreat from Afghanistan. In this regard, he had held a party conference that he invited the Communist Party and Pakistan Peoples Party to discuss to end the bloodshed in Afghanistan. In 1987, he provided his political support and eventually used his prerogative to appoint Lieutenant-General Mirza Aslam Beg as vice-army chief, despite President Zia wanting Lieutenant-General Zahid Ali Akbar who was sent to DESTO.

Prime Minister Junejo also stalled the fundamentalist legislation in an attempt to keep leverage on President Zia. Following the massive explosion near a hidden facility in Rawalpindi Cantonment that resulted in more than 100 lives lost, Prime Minister Junejo announced to call for a parliamentary inquiry to overlook the incident.

On 28 May 1988, DG ISPR Brigadier Siddique Salik informed Prime Minister Junejo of President Zia holding the press conference the next day in this regards, terming it "very important." On 29 May 1988, President Zia appeared on PTV News and surprisingly announced to have dissolved the Parliament, using the Eighth Amendment. Many investigative newspapers and political gossips pointed that it was the inquiry report on the "Ojhri Camp disaster" that implicated the military members in Zia's administration despite President Zia claiming of Junejo's Government had been dismissed because the law and order situation had broken down to an alarming extent and the government could not be run in accordance with the Constitution.

During the general elections held in 1988, he was unsuccessful for defending his constituency but was elected for the National Assembly general elections held in 1990 and remained head of the PML.

Later life and death 
In 1993, he was diagnosed with leukemia and went to the United States for the treatment where he was treated at the Johns Hopkins Hospital in Baltimore, Maryland, United States, where he died the same year. He was brought and buried in his locality.

His widow, Begum Junejo, died in Karachi on July 13, 2003, at the age of 60.

Further reading

References

External links

 
 

|-

|-

1932 births
1993 deaths
Sindhi people
St. Patrick's High School, Karachi alumni
Pakistani anti-communists
Pakistani landowners
Pakistan Muslim League politicians
Military government of Pakistan (1977–1988)
Defence Ministers of Pakistan
Interior ministers of Pakistan
Prime Ministers of Pakistan
Deaths from leukemia
Pakistani Muslims
Pakistani MNAs 1985–1988
People from Mirpur Khas District
Pakistani MNAs 1990–1993
Pakistan Muslim League (J) politicians
Pakistani MNAs 1962–1965
Pakistani MNAs 1965–1969
Minister of Railways (Pakistan)